Indian Revenge (German: Indische Rache) is a 1920 German silent adventure film directed by Georg Jacoby and Léo Lasko and starring Georg Alexander, Mady Christians, and Harry Liedtke.

The film's sets were designed by the art director Kurt Richter.

Cast
In alphabetical order
Georg Alexander as Bob Dickson
Mady Christians
Ernst Dernburg as William Astor 
Max Laurence as captain
Harry Liedtke as Edward 
Mabel May-Yong
Edith Meller as Ellinor Glyn 
Albert Patry
Josef Peterhans as Chief Priest of Kali 
Emil Rameau as Indian #2
Bruno Wiesner as Indian #1 
Bruno Ziener

References

External links

1920 adventure films
German adventure films
Films of the Weimar Republic
German silent feature films
Films directed by Georg Jacoby
Films directed by Léo Lasko
German black-and-white films
Films set in the British Raj
UFA GmbH films
Silent adventure films
1920s German films